Tonima Hamid is a Bangladeshi model, actress and teacher. She is from Mymensingh, Bangladesh.

Personal life 
Tonima Hamid is the daughter of M.Hamid and Falguni Hamid. She is married to Shamsul Haider Dalim, who is a news presenter and host. She is a mother of a boy named Arniv.

Early life 
Tonima completed her SSC from Agrani Girls High School, Azimpur, Dhaka. Later, she completed her Honors-Masters from the Department of History, Dhaka University.

Career 
Tonima started acting at the age of three or four. Her first play on stage was Bracket's 'Chalk Circle' as Shahjada Bulbul. After that when she in class 7, she acted in a Tagore's short story called ‘Mallodan’ in 1992. So far she has acted in many more plays on behalf of her team Natyachakra like - 'Let There Be Light'. She is currently working as a lecturer in the Social Relations department of the capital's East West University.

Works

Theatre

Television drama

Radio drama

Drama Series

Telefilms

TVC

Television host

References 

Living people
21st-century Bangladeshi actresses
Bangladeshi models
1980 births